Radiant Sea: A Collection of Bootleg Rarities and Two New Songs is a compilation album from the band Live. Released in 2007, the album features ten live concert recordings of previously released songs, and two studio-recorded songs that were previously unreleased. The disc was only available at Live concerts or from the band's online store at their official website.

Track listing
"The Beauty of Gray" – 4:48
"Pillar of Davidson" – 6:25
"Shit Towne" – 4:26
"I Alone" – 6:45
"Lakini's Juice" – 5:19
"The Distance" – 7:32
"The Dolphin's Cry" – 4:40
"Nobody Knows" – 4:46
"Sweet Release" – 3:14
"Overcome" – 4:20
"Beautiful Invisible"* – 3:22
"Radiant Sea"* – 3:40

(*) indicates a studio recording

Live (band) compilation albums
Self-released albums
2007 compilation albums
2007 live albums